The Battle of Issers was a conflict that took place in 1519 between the forces of Sidi Ahmed of Kuku and Hayreddin Barbarossa of the Regency of Algiers.

In 1518 Sidi Ahmed and Oruç Reis led a joint expedition against the Spaniards in Tlemcen which failed and resulted in the death of Oruç Reis. Hayreddin Barbarossa resented Sidi Ahmed as his troops had seemingly abandoned Oruç Reis.

Hayreddin Barbarossa assumed military command of Algiers and immediately organised an expedition against Sidi Ahmed which led to a sharp conflict. The Hafsids had also sent reinforcements to Sidi Ahmed. Sidi Ahmed attacked the troops of the Regency of Algiers from behind and inflicted heavy losses on the army of Hayreddin Barbarossa, the battle was described as bloody. Sidi Ahmed won the battle and even went on to capture Algiers the following year.

References 

History of Algiers